is a system of natural science, astronomy, almanac, divination and magic that developed independently in Japan based on the Chinese philosophies of yin and yang and wuxing (five elements). The philosophy of yin and yang and wu xing was introduced to Japan at the beginning of the 6th century, and, influenced by Taoism, Buddhism, and Confucianism, evolved into the earliest system of Onmyōdō around the late 7th century. In 701, the Taiho Code established the departments and posts of onmyōji who practiced Onmyōdō in the Imperial Court, and Onmyōdō was institutionalized. Abe no Seimei, who was active during Heian period, is the most famous onmyōji (Onmyōdō practitioner) in Japanese history and has appeared in various Japanese literature in later years. Onmyōdō was under the control of the imperial government, and later its courtiers, the Tsuchimikado family, until the middle of the 19th century, at which point it became prohibited as superstition.

Development
In the 5th and 6th centuries, the principles of yin-yang and the Five Elements were transmitted to Japan from China and Baekje along with Buddhism and Confucianism, particularly by the obscure Korean monk Gwalleuk. Yin-yang and the Five Elements, as well as the divisions of learning to which they were linked – astronomy, calendar-making, the reckoning of time, divination, and studies based on observation of nature – were amalgamated into fortune telling. This process of judging auspicious or harmful signs present in the natural world, was accepted into Japanese society as a technique for predicting good or bad fortune in the human world. Such techniques were known mostly by Buddhist monks from mainland Asia, who were knowledgeable in reading and writing Chinese. Over time, demand from members of the imperial court who believed that Onmyōdō divination would be helpful in decision-making, made it necessary for the laity to perform the art, and onmyōji began to appear around the middle of the 7th century. Under the Taiho Code enacted in the early 8th century, the departments of the Imperial Court to which onmyōji belonged were defined by law.

From around the 9th century during the Heian period, Onmyōdō interacted with Shinto and Goryō worship in Japan, and developed into a system unique to Japan. Until then, Onmyōdō emphasized divination for policy decisions by high government officials, but since the Heian period, Onmyōdō has emphasized magic and religious services such as warding off evil for preventing natural disasters and epidemics and for the productiveness of grain, as well as curses against opponents. Because Shinto places importance on 'purity' Shinto priests were required to perform misogi (ritual purification) and fast before performing these religious services, so their activities were restricted. On the other hand, since onmyōji did not have to perform misogi  or fast, they were able to deal with kegare (uncleanness) more easily, and they expanded their activities beyond the support of Shinto priests. It gradually spread from the Imperial Court to the general public. In the 10th century  and his son , made great advancements in Onmyōdō, astronomy and calendar science. From among their students emerged , who displayed superior skills in the divining arts of Onmyōdō, by which he gained an uncommon amount of trust from the court society. Tadayuki and Yasunori passed on their skills in astronomy to Seimei while their advances in calendar-making went to Yasunori's son. From the end of the Heian period into the Middle Ages, astronomy and calendar science were completely subsumed into Onmyōdō, and the Abe and Kamo families came to dominate the art in the Imperial Court.

Onmyōji

 was one of the classifications of civil servants belonging to the Bureau of Onmyō in ancient Japan's ritsuryo system. People with this title were professional practitioners of Onmyōdō.

Onmyōji were specialists in magic and divination. Their court responsibilities ranged from tasks such as keeping track of the calendar, to mystical duties such as divination and protection of the capital from evil spirits. They could divine auspicious or harmful influences in the earth, and were instrumental in the moving of capitals. It is said that an onmyōji could also summon and control shikigami. During the Heian period the nobility organized their lives around practices recommended by onmyōji. The practice of "lucky and unlucky directions" provides an example. Depending on the season, time of day, and other circumstances, a particular direction might be bad luck for an individual. If one's house was located in that direction, such an individual was advised not to go back directly to his house but had to "change direction" (katatagae), by going in a different direction and lodging there. Such a person would not dare to go in the forbidden direction, but stayed where they were, even if that resulted in absence from the court, or passing up invitations from influential people.

Famous onmyōji include Kamo no Yasunori and Abe no Seimei (921–1005). After Seimei's death, the Emperor Ichijō had a shrine erected at his home in Kyoto.

Onmyōji had political clout during the Heian period, but in later times when the imperial court fell into decline, their state patronage was lost completely. In modern-day Japan onmyōji are defined as a type of priest, and although there are many who claim to be mediums and spiritualists, the onmyōji continues to be a hallmark occult figure.

See also
 Chinese alchemy
 Chinese fortune telling
 Chinese influence on Japanese culture
 Dogū
 Futomani
 Haniwa
 Hōko (doll)
 Itako
 Konjin
 Kokkuri
 Ofuda
 Omamori
 Onmyōji 
 Omikuji
 Shikigami
 Shugendō
 Tengenjutsu (fortune telling)
 Zuijin

References

Further reading

Kin'ugyokuto-shū (金烏玉兎集/三国相伝陰陽輨轄簠簋内伝金烏玉兎集, "the collection book of the moon and the jade rabbit")
 Senji Ryakketsu (占事略决, "the summary to judgements of divinations") by Abe no Seimei

External links

 占事略決(Big5 Chinese) Online text of Senji Ryakketsu.
 金烏玉兎集巻第一 Online text of Kinugyokutoshū volume 1.

 
Divination
Esoteric cosmology
Taoism in Japan
Religion in Japan
Eastern esotericism